Kate O'Mara (born Francesca Meredith Carroll;  10 August 1939 – 30 March 2014) was an English film, stage and television actress, and writer. O'Mara made her stage debut in a 1963 production of The Merchant of Venice. Her other stage roles included Elvira in Blithe Spirit (1974), Lady Macbeth in Macbeth (1982), Cleopatra in Antony & Cleopatra (1982), Goneril in King Lear (1987) and Marlene Dietrich in Lunch with Marlene (2008).

In the cinema, O'Mara acted in two 1970 Hammer Horror films: The Vampire Lovers and The Horror of Frankenstein. On BBC television, she had regular roles in The Brothers (1975–1976), Triangle (1981–1982) and Howards' Way (1989–1990), and portrayed Doctor Who villain the Rani three times (1985–1993). She also appeared as Jackie Stone in two episodes of the sitcom Absolutely Fabulous (1995–2003). On American television, she played Caress Morell, the scheming sister of Alexis Colby in the primetime soap opera Dynasty (1986).

Early life and career
O'Mara was born to John F. Carroll, an RAF flying instructor, and actress Hazel Bainbridge (born Edith Marion Bainbridge; 25 January 1910 – 7 January 1998). Her younger sister is actress Belinda Carroll. After boarding school she attended art school before becoming a full-time actress. O'Mara made her stage debut in a production of The Merchant of Venice in 1963, although her first film role was some years earlier (under the name Merrie Carroll) in Home and Away (1956) with Jack Warner, as her father, and Kathleen Harrison.

Her earliest television appearances,  in the 1960s, included guest roles in Danger Man, Adam Adamant Lives!, The Saint, Z-Cars and The Avengers. In 1970, she appeared in two Hammer Studio horror films: The Vampire Lovers and The Horror of Frankenstein. In the former, she had an erotically charged scene with Ingrid Pitt, in which O'Mara was meant to be seduced; the two women were left laughing on set, however, as Pitt's fangs kept falling into O'Mara's cleavage.  O'Mara's work in The Vampire Lovers impressed Hammer enough for them to offer her a contract, which she turned down, fearful of being typecast.

Her first major TV role was as Julia Main, wife of the main protagonist in the ITV series The Main Chance (1969). She had a regular role in the BBC drama series The Brothers (1975–1976) as Jane Maxwell, and in the early 1980s, O'Mara starred in the BBC soap opera Triangle (1981–1982), sometimes counted among the worst television series ever made. She played the villainous Rani in Doctor Who in two serials, The Mark of the Rani (1985) and Time and the Rani (1987), and also in the Doctor Who 30th anniversary spoof Dimensions in Time (1993), part of the Children in Need charity event.

Between these appearances in Doctor Who, she auditioned for a leading role as one of the sisters on the American primetime soap The Colbys, a spin-off of the American prime time soap opera Dynasty. Eventually, O'Mara was offered one of the roles alongside Stephanie Beacham, but declined since was still under contract with a production of stage play Light Up the Sky at the Old Vic Theatre. Shortly after, she was offered the part of Caress Morell on Dynasty. As the sister of Alexis Colby (Joan Collins), O'Mara appeared in 17 episodes of the sixth season and 4 episodes of the seventh during 1986. "We had a tremendous bitchy tension between us", the actress recalled about performing opposite Collins. “My character Caress was like an annoying little mosquito who just kept coming back and biting her.” O'Mara disliked living in California, preferring the change of seasons in Britain, and to her relief was released from her five-year contract after Collins told the producers that having two brunettes in the series was a bad idea. After returning to the UK, she was cast as another scheming villain, Laura Wilde, in the BBC soap Howards' Way (1989–1990).

Later life and career

O'Mara spoke on several occasions about her experience with the casting couch. On an episode of The Word in 1994, O'Mara claimed that American producer Judd Bernard pulled down her panties during a hotel-room audition for the Elvis Presley vehicle Double Trouble. In her autobiography Vamp Until Ready: A Life Laid Bare, O'Mara described this incident and "many other close encounters with... this very unpleasant and humiliating procedure", including with a well-known television casting director, the boss of Associated Television at ATV Elstree Studios, and the director of Great Catherine.

O'Mara continued to make television appearances throughout the 1990s, including Cluedo (1990), and playing Jackie Stone (Patsy's older sister) in two episodes of Absolutely Fabulous (1995–2003). In 2001, she had a recurring role in the ITV prison drama series Bad Girls before appearing in the short-lived revival of the soap opera Crossroads. She continued to perform on stage and in March 2008 she played Marlene Dietrich in a stage play entitled Lunch with Marlene. From August to November 2008, she played Mrs Cheveley in Oscar Wilde's stage play An Ideal Husband directed by Peter Hall and produced by Bill Kenwright. She performed in radio and audio plays. In 2000 she reprised her role as the Rani in the BBV audio play The Rani Reaps the Whirlwind, and in 2006 she made a guest appearance in the radio comedy series Nebulous.

In 2012, O'Mara appeared in a theatre adaptation of Agatha Christie's Death on the Nile.

Personal life
O'Mara was married twice, first to Jeremy Young in 1971; the couple divorced in 1976. In 1993, she married Richard Willis, but the marriage was dissolved in 1996. She had two sons, Dickon Young (1964–2012) and Christopher Linde (born 1965), both from previous relationships, although Dickon took his stepfather's surname. She gave up Linde for adoption and he was named by his adoptive parents, Derek and Joy Linde.

Christopher, from whom the actress was long estranged, was born from her relationship with actor David Orchard.

Dickon, whose biological father was reportedly actor Ian Cullen, was a stage manager for the Royal Shakespeare Company before setting up his own company building tree-houses in the mid-1990s. He was found hanged, a presumed suicide, at the family home in Long Marston, Warwickshire, on 31 December 2012, after previous suicide attempts. O'Mara was in hospital with pneumonia at the time of her son's death and his body was not discovered for three weeks.

O'Mara wrote four books, two novels (When She Was Bad and Good Time Girl), and two autobiographical books, Vamp Until Ready and Game Plan: A Woman's Survival Kit.

Speaking about her bouts of depression, later in her life, O'Mara said: "... I've since learnt a cure for depression: listening to J.S. Bach and reading P.G. Wodehouse. This got me through the break-up of my second marriage 17 years ago. The great thing about Wodehouse is that his books are full of romantic problems and yet so hilarious that it puts things in perspective ... I'm not frightened of dying, but I love the countryside so much and I'm going to miss it. I'd like to be out in the wind and the trees for ever."

Death
O'Mara died on 30 March 2014 in a Sussex nursing home, aged 74, from ovarian cancer. She left a £350,000 estate, bequeathing £10,000 to the Actors’ Benevolent Fund and, after the funeral and legal fees, the remainder to her younger sister Belinda Carroll, a former actress.

Filmography

Film

Television

Select stage roles
 1963, Jessica, The Merchant of Venice at the Shaftesbury Theatre.
 1966, Lydia Languish, The Rivals at The Welsh Theatre Co.
 1967, Elsa, The Italian Girl at the Wyndham's Theatre
 1970, Fleda Vetch, The Spoils of Poynton at the Mayfair Theatre
 1971, Gerda Von Metz, The Avengers (directed by Leslie Phillips) at the Prince of Wales Theatre
 1971–2, Sheila Wallis, Suddenly at Home at the Fortune Theatre
 1974, Elvira, Blithe Spirit at the Bristol Old Vic
 1974, Liza Moriarty, Sherlock's Last Case at the Open Space Theatre Fortune Theatre
 1977, Sybil Merton, Lord Arthur Saville's Crime at the Sadlers Wells Theatre
 1977, Louka, Arms and the Man at the Hong Kong Festival
 1978, Rosaline, Loves Labour's Lost at the Thorndike Theatre
 1978, Katherina, The Taming of the Shrew at the Ludlow Festival
 1978, Cyrenne, Rattle of a Simple Man
 1979, Monica Claverton- Ferry, The Elder Statesman
 1979, Lina, Misalliance at The Birmingham Rep
 1979, Irene St Clair, The Crucifer of Blood at the Haymarket Theatre
 1980, Ruth, Night and Day, at post-London tour
 1981, Stephanie Abrahams, Duet for One Yugoslavia and tour
 1981, Beatrice, Much Ado About Nothing at the New Shakespeare Co
 1982, Kathrina, The Taming of the Shrew at the Nottingham Playhouse\New Shakespeare Co
 1982, Titania\Hippolta, A Midsummer Night's Dream at the New Shakespeare Co
 1982, Lady Macbeth, Macbeth at the Mercury Theatre
 1982, Cleopatra, Antony and Cleopatra at the Nottingham Playhouse
 1982, Millamant, The Way of the World at the Nottingham Playhouse
 1983, Hortense, The Rehearsal
 1984, Mistress Ford, The Merry Wives of Windsor at the New Shakespeare Co
 1985 – 1987, Frances Black, Light Up the Sky at the Old Vic & Globe Theatres
 1987, Goneril, King Lear at the Compass Theatre
 1988, Berinthia, The Relapse at the Mermaid Theatre
 1990, Torfreida, The Last Englishman at The Orange Tree Theatre
 1990, Martha, Who's Afraid of Virginia Woolf at the Yvonne Arnaud Theatre
 1991, Lilli Vanessi, Kiss Me Kate, RSC tour
 1992, Lady Fanciful, The Provok'd Wife at the National Theatre Studio
 1992, Rosabel, Venus Observed at the Chichester Festival
 1992, Eve, Cain at the Chichester Festival
 1992, Jackie, King Lear in New York at the Chichester Festival
 1994, Maria Wislack, On Approval
 1995, Pola, The Simpleton of the Unexpected Isles at The Orange Tree Theatre
 1995, Rachel, My Cousin Rachel, English Theatre, Vienna and tour 1995
 1996, Olivia, Twelfth Night at the Haymarket Theatre, Basingstoke
 1996–7, Mrs Cheveley, An Ideal Husband at the Haymarket, Albury and Gielgud theatres
 2000, Mrs. Malaprop\Lucy, The Rivals
 2000, Madame Alexandre, Colombe at the Salisbury Playhouse
 2003, Gertrude Lawrence, Noel and Gertie
 2004, Mrs Arbuthnot, A Woman of No Importance
 2005, Eloise, The Marquise at the Mercury Theatre
 2005, Helen, We Happy Few at the Gielgud Theatre
 2008, Marlene Dietrich, Lunch with Marlene at The New End Theatre
 2010, Lady Windermere, Lord Arthur Saville's Crime at the Mercury Theatre

See also
English actresses
Cinema of the United Kingdom
Television in the United Kingdom

References

Bibliography

External links
 

1939 births
2014 deaths
Actresses from Leicestershire
Alumni of the Aida Foster Theatre School
Deaths from cancer in England
Deaths from ovarian cancer
English film actresses
English memoirists
English soap opera actresses
English stage actresses
English television actresses
People from Leicester
British women memoirists
English women novelists
20th-century English actresses
20th-century English novelists
20th-century English women writers
21st-century English actresses
English women non-fiction writers